Lamiophanes is an extinct genus of beetle in the family Cerambycidae. It contains a single species, Lamiophanes schroeteri, described by Christoph Gottfried Andreas Giebel in 1856 based on material from the Lulworth Formation.

References

†
Prehistoric beetles
Fossil taxa described in 1856
Fossils of Great Britain
Prehistoric insects of Europe